John J. Sherman (born September 6, 1967) is an American professional bodybuilder.

Education
John Sherman attended, from 1984 to 1988, the University of Houston.

Deputy career
From September 1988 to September 1999, Sherman was a deputy for the Harris County Sheriff's Office.

Bodybuilding career

Amateur

Professional

Competition history
 1987 NPC Texas State Championships - 1st (LW)
 1988 NPC Collegiate Nationals - 1st (Overall and MW)
 1988 NPC USA Championships - 3rd (MW)
 1989 NPC USA Championships - 1st (MW)
 1990 NPC Nationals - 4th (LHW)
 1991 NPC Nationals - 5th (LHW)
 1992 NPC Nationals - 1st (Overall and LHW)
 1992 NPC USA Championships - 1st (LHW)
 1993 IFBB Chicago Pro Championships - 2nd
 1993 IFBB Grand Prix England - 12th
 1993 IFBB Grand Prix Finland - 9th
 1993 IFBB Grand Prix France (2) - 15th
 1993 IFBB Grand Prix Germany (2) - 12th
 1993 IFBB Grand Prix Spain - 10th
 1993 IFBB Night of Champions - 3rd
 1993 IFBB Mr. Olympia - DNP
 1993 IFBB Pittsburgh Pro Invitational - 8th
 1994 IFBB Chicago Pro Championships - 2nd
 1994 IFBB Niagara Falls Pro Invitational - 2nd
 1994 IFBB Night of Champions - 3rd
 1994 IFBB Mr. Olympia - 16th
 1995 IFBB Houston Pro Championships - 4th
 2000 IFBB Night of Champions - DNP
 2000 IFBB Toronto Pro - 15th
 2001 IFBB Ironman Pro Invitational - 9th
 2001 IFBB San Francisco Pro - 7th
 2007 IFBB New York Pro Championships - 10th
 2010 IFBB Phoenix Pro - 11th (Open)
 2013 IFBB Chicago Pro Championships - 6th (LW)
 2013 IFBB Phoenix Pro - 9th (LW)
 2014 IFBB Phoenix Pro - 6th (LW)

Personal life

Sherman is a Christian. He currently lives in Houston, Texas. He is currently the owner of Fitness Fanatics and Great Earth Vitamins (since March 2007).

References

External links

1967 births
African-American Christians
African-American bodybuilders
Living people
Sportspeople from Harris County, Texas
Sportspeople from Houston
People from Katy, Texas
Professional bodybuilders
Sportspeople from Texas
University of Houston alumni
21st-century African-American people
20th-century African-American sportspeople